Veor Cove is a beach in Cornwall, UK. It is about 1 mile northwest of the village of Zennor, and immediately to the west of Pendour Cove.

The name of this cove is from the  Cornish 'veor' meaning large or great.

References

External links

Veor Cove

Beaches of Penwith
Coves of Cornwall
Zennor